Western Bukidnon Manobo is a Manobo language of Mindanao in the Philippines.

Distribution and dialects
Western Bukidnon Manobo is spoken in the following locations:

Southern Bukidnon Province: Dangcagan, Don Carlos, Kitaotao, and especially Maramag municipalities
Cotabato Province: Banisilan municipality

Its dialects are Ilentungen, Kiriyenteken, and Pulangiyen.

References

Further reading

 
  – published version of Elkins's 1967 dissertation

External links
 Austronesian Basic Vocabulary Database: Manobo, Western Bukidnon

Manobo languages
Languages of Bukidnon